Synuchus assamensis is a species of ground beetle in the subfamily Harpalinae. It was described by Deuve in 1986.

References

Synuchus
Beetles described in 1986